The Best of Dan Peek is the fifth solo album by former America member Dan Peek and his first compilation. Released in 1988, it includes songs from his first four albums,  All Things Are Possible, Doer of the Word, Electro-Voice, and Cross Over. Several of the songs were hits on contemporary Christian music stations. While he would collaborate with Ken Marvin and Brian Gentry on several projects, this would be Peek's last solo release for more than a decade.

Track listing 
 "Love Was Just Another World" (Chris Christian, Steve Kipner)
 "All Things Are Possible" (Dan Peek, Chris Christian)
 "Doer of the Word" (Jeremy Dalton)
 "Everything" (Dan Peek, Chris Christian, Phil Naish)
 "A New Song" (Dan Peek)
 "Lonely People" (Dan & Catherine Peek)
 "His Own" (Dan Peek)
 "Electro Voice" (Dan Peek)
 "Cross Over" (Dan Peek)
 "I Will Not Be Silent" (Brian Gentry, Ken Marvin, Terry Sachen)

References 

1988 compilation albums